Aahat is a Pakistani television series first broadcast on Pakistan Television Corporation. It is written by Haseena Moin and directed by Sahira Kazmi. The 7 episode series ran from 1991 to 1992 and stars Sania Saeed, Salman Ahmad and Samina Ahmad in leading roles. Aahat focuses on the subject of family planning.

Plot 
The series revolves around a couple who have big dreams about their individual dreams. However, after their marriage, the life changes when they have to face problems due to many children. The societal pressure of giving birth to a male child led them to keep trying for it.

Cast 
 Sania Saeed as Rabya
 Salman Ahmad as Amir
 Samina Ahmed as Bushra (Amir's mother)
 Huma Nawab as Fouzia
 Qazi Wajid as Anwar
 Talat Naseer as Naheed
 Jahanara Hai as Naheed's mother 
 Salma Zafar as Rajjo Masi
 Ahmad Kapadia as Daniyal
 Ubaida Ansari as Doctor Sahiba
 Nabeela Isfahani as Saba
 Zahra Malik as Meena
 Imtiaz Taj as Rajjo's Husband 
 Anam as Guriya
 Tasneem Rana as Bibi Janti
 Shan Shirazi as Nashi
 Masood Zia as Driver

Production

Casting 
According to Saeed, she was cast in the series due to her understanding towards the issue, not on the basis of her acting skills.

Broadcast 
An Arabic dubbed version of the series was broadcast in Saudia Arbaia.

References

External links 
 

Pakistani drama television series
1991 television series debuts
Pakistan Television Corporation original programming
1992 television series endings
Pakistani family television dramas